Eleutherodactylus barlagnei is a species of frog in the family Eleutherodactylidae endemic to Guadeloupe and known from the Basse-Terre Island. It is an aquatic frog that lives in both large and small streams. It prefers boulders in reasonably fast-moving waters. It usually occurs in rainforest but can also found in grassy savanna and in disturbed habitats where trees are present. Its altitudinal range is  asl. The eggs are laid on vegetation and in rock crevices.

E. pinchoni are moderately common in suitable habitat, but such stream habitats are limited in extend and continue to decline in quality. The species is also threatened by pollution from pesticides used in banana plantations and domestically. It might also be threatened by introduced predators (rats, cats and mongooses), the introduced frog Eleutherodactylus johnstonei, and chytridiomycosis.

References

barlagnei
Amphibians of the Caribbean
Endemic fauna of Guadeloupe
Vertebrates of Guadeloupe
Taxa named by John Douglas Lynch
Amphibians described in 1965
Taxonomy articles created by Polbot